Alfred Cove is a southern suburb of Perth, Western Australia. Its local government area is the City of Melville.

History
It is named after the adjacent sheltered cove in the Swan River, which is in turn named after Alfred Waylen who was born at Point Walter in 1833 and who was granted Swan Location 74, covering most of present-day Alfred Cove and Myaree.

The suburb contains Tompkins Park, Bill Sweet Park and Sid Eaton Reserve.

As of 2016, Alfred Cove had a population of 2,550.

Wildlife 
The suburb is home to a variety of migrant and native species of birds and animals as the hinterland offers a comfortable habitat including the mudflats, seagrass beds and intertidal vegetation. Some of the migratory wading birds come from as far as Siberia, Mongolia and Asia and many of these species are protected under international agreements.

See also
 Electoral district of Alfred Cove

References

External links

Suburbs of Perth, Western Australia
Swan River (Western Australia)
Suburbs in the City of Melville